Avery Anderson III (born September 26, 2000) is an American college basketball player for the Oklahoma State Cowboys of the Big 12 Conference.

Early life and high school career
Anderson lived in New Orleans until age four, when his family evacuated due to Hurricane Katrina and moved to Alabama before settling in Texas. He attended Northwest High School in Justin, Texas. Anderson averaged 22.7 points as a senior. He left as the school's all-time leading scorer with 2,767 career points. A four-star recruit, he committed to playing college basketball for Oklahoma State over offers from TCU, Texas Tech, Florida and LSU.

College career
As a freshman at Oklahoma State, Anderson averaged 4.2 points and 2.1 rebounds per game. On March 6, 2021, he scored 31 points in an 85–80 upset win over sixth-ranked West Virginia, while his teammates Cade Cunningham and Isaac Likekele were sidelined with injuries. As a sophomore, Anderson averaged 12.2 points, 4 rebounds and 2 assists per game, shooting 47.5 percent from the floor. Following the season he declared for the 2021 NBA draft, but ultimately returned to Oklahoma State. Anderson was named to the Third Team All-Big 12 as a junior.

Career statistics

College

|-
| style="text-align:left;"| 2019–20
| style="text-align:left;"| Oklahoma State
| 30 || 5 || 15.3 || .364 || .077 || .800 || 2.1 || 1.4 || 1.0 || .3 || 4.2
|-
| style="text-align:left;"| 2020–21
| style="text-align:left;"| Oklahoma State
| 27 || 23 || 30.4 || .475 || .328 || .839 || 4.0 || 2.0 || 1.5 || .3 || 12.2
|- class="sortbottom"
| style="text-align:center;" colspan="2"| Career
| 57 || 28 || 22.5 || .436 || .250 || .828 || 3.0 || 1.7 || 1.2 || .3 || 8.0

References

External links
Oklahoma State Cowboys bio

2000 births
Living people
American men's basketball players
Basketball players from New Orleans
Basketball players from Texas
Point guards
Oklahoma State Cowboys basketball players